Kaeng phrik kraduk mu is a variety of Thai curry from the areas of southern Thailand. It is similar to Kaeng pa in that it usually contains no coconut milk, but uses turmeric instead of galangal. Kaeng phrik kraduk mhu is popular in Southern Thailand.

Thai curries